This article refers to the Torah book. For the second Rebbe of the Sochatchov Hasidic dynasty, see Shmuel Bornsztain.
Shem Mishmuel is a nine-volume collection of homiletical teachings on the Torah and Jewish holidays delivered by Rabbi Shmuel Bornsztain, the second Sochatchover Rebbe, between the years 1910-1926. A major work in Hasidic thought, it synthesizes the Hasidism of Pshischa and Kotzk in the style of Sochatchov, and is frequently cited in Torah shiurim (lectures) and articles to this day.

Bornsztain became known as the Shem Mishmuel after the title of this work, which was published posthumously.

Title 
The title comes from the Mishnah on Shabbat 12:3, which describes the prohibition against writing on Shabbat. The Mishnah teaches that if a Jew wishes to write a whole name like Shimon (שמעון) or Shmuel (שמואל), but writes only the first two letters of these names, shin (ש) and mem (מ), he still transgresses the prohibition—for shin and mem spell a shorter name, shem (שם) (which literally means "name"). Bornsztain's choice of the Mishnaic expression shem miShimon o miShmuel (Shem from Shimon or from Shmuel) for his title reflects the classical rabbinic play on words combining a rabbinic teaching with the author's own name.

Content and structure
The first eight volumes of Shem Mishmuel cover lessons on each of the parshiyot (weekly Torah readings). In traditional Hasidic style, they are not printed according to the sequence of the parshiyot, but in the order in which the Rebbe delivered these lessons to his followers. The ninth volume deals exclusively with the Passover Haggadah.

In addition to displaying a thorough familiarity with Talmud, Midrash, Kabbalah, and other classic Jewish sources, Bornsztain presents many of the ideas of his father, Rabbi Avrohom Bornsztain, the first Sochatchover Rebbe, who was known as the Avnei Nezer after the title of his major work.

Printing history
The volume on the Pesach Haggadah was published first by Bornsztain's son and successor, Rabbi Dovid Bornsztain, the third Sochatchover Rebbe, in Piotrków in 1927. Rabbi Dovid published the rest of the volumes between 1927 and 1932, with funding provided by Rabbi David Parshinowski. Bornsztain's other son, Rabbi Chanoch Henoch Bornsztain, who had immigrated to Israel in 1924 and became the fourth Sochatchover Rebbe after Rabbi David's death in the Warsaw Ghetto in 1942, published the second edition of Shem Mishmuel in Jerusalem in 1950 with the aid of Rabbi Avraham Parshan, son of Rabbi Parshinowski.

Rabbi Parshan also assisted with the publication of a third edition in 1965. The third edition of the volume dealing with the Hagaddah included an additional section containing chiddushei Torah (new Torah thoughts) on the Hagaddah which had been penned by Rabbi Dovid and which had survived the war, entitled Chasdei Dovid. Other editions followed; the seventh, corrected edition used by Rabbi Zvi Belovski in his English translation for Targum Press was published in Israel in 1988 by the Parshan family trust in memory of Rabbi Parshan.

References

External links
Shem Meshmuel A synopsis of the teachings of Bornsztain's school of thought
Shem Mishmuel Citation Index A citation index of Tanach and Talmudic sources to the Shem Mishmuel

1927 non-fiction books
Books published posthumously
Hebrew-language names
Jewish mystical texts
Jewish philosophical and ethical texts
Sochatchov (Hasidic dynasty)
Hebrew-language religious books
Sifrei Kodesh
Hasidic_literature